Fulgencio Argüelles (born January 6, 1955), is a Spanish writer and psychologist.

Life 
Born in 1955 in the Orillés neighborhood of Aller, Asturias,   Argüelles studied psychology at the Comillas Pontifical University  and the Complutense University of Madrid, specializing in sociology of work and organizations. After a long residence in Madrid, he returned in 1997 to Asturias to live in the village of Cenera (Mieres), where he had lived as a child. He now is now a Socialist representative on the city council (ayuntamiento) of Mieres.

He wrote prize-winning short stories in both Spanish and Asturian before publishing his first novel.  His novels include Letanías de lluvia, winner of the Premio Azorín, 1992; Los clamores de la tierra; Recuerdos de algún vivir,  winner of the Premio Principado de Asturias, 2000, granted by the Fundación Dolores Medio; and El Palacio de los ingenieros belgas, winner of the Premio Café Gijón 2003. He has also published two books of short stories, Del color de la nada and Seronda, the latter written in Asturian and in collaboration with the Asturian painter J. Enrique Maojo.

Works

Novels 
 Letanías de lluvia (Alfaguara, 1993), winner of the Premio Azorín de Novela, 1992.
 Los clamores de la tierra (Alfaguara, 1996), an historical fiction set in the first years of the reign of Ramiro I of Asturias (reigned 843–850).
 Recuerdos de algún vivir (Nobel, 2000), winner of the Premio de Novela Principado de Asturias 2000. 
 El palacio azul de los ingenieros belgas (Acantilado, 2003), winner of the Premio Café Gijón de Novela, 2003.
 A la sombra de los abedules (TREA, 2011)

Books of short stories 
Del color de la nada
Seronda (Academia de la Llingua Asturiana, 2004): stories in Asturian, illustrated by Jorge Enrique Maojo.

Other
 Argüelles' story Cuando los balones se volvieron invisibles is the first work of forty in the anthology Cuentos de fútbol (Alfaguara, 1995).

Notes

External links 
  Lupercio González, Suplemento Asturias: Fulgencio Argüelles, revistafusion.com, April 2001.
  Luis García, Entrevista a Fulgencio Argüelles: "Disfruto inventando mundos novelescos", literaturas.com, no date.

Writers from Asturias
1955 births
Living people
People from Aller, Asturias
Spanish historical novelists
Spanish male novelists
Asturian language
Spanish psychologists
Comillas Pontifical University alumni